Madeleine Beauséjour is a film editor and director from Réunion.

Her 1988 short French-Creole film Koman I le la sours portrayed the life of a young mother in the La Source district in Saint-Denis, whose house is used as a hangout by the local children.

Films
 Koman I le la Sours, 1988

References

External links
 

Living people
Year of birth missing (living people)
Women from Réunion
Film directors from Réunion
French film editors
French women film editors